Church of Humanity was a positivist church in England influenced and inspired by Auguste Comte's Religion of Humanity in France.  It also had a branch or variant in New York City, Brazil and other locations. Richard Congreve founded the first English Church of  Humanity in 1859, just two years after Comte's death. Despite being relatively small the church had several notable members and ex-members. For example, Ann Margaret Lindholm was raised in the "Church of Humanity" before converting to Catholicism.

The New York City version originates with English immigrant Henry Edger. In 1854 he decided to dedicate himself to the "positive faith", just two years after his mentor Congreve in Britain. In 1869 an American organization formed with David Goodman Croly as a leading member. Croly strongly believed in the religious element of Comtism, but was somewhat limited in evangelizing for it. By the 1870s the positivist organization led to an American version of the "Church of Humanity." This was largely modeled on the English church. Like the English version it wasn't atheistic and had sermons and sacramental rites. At times the services  included readings from conventional religious works like the Book of Isaiah. It was not as significant as the church in England, but did include several educated people unrelated to Croly. Nevertheless, one of the most noted people raised and baptized in the New York "Church of Humanity" was David Croly's son Herbert Croly. The church of humanity possibly had its greatest impact in Britain.

Temples of Humanity 
 Chapel Street Hall — Lamb's Conduit Street, London
 Chapelle de l’Humanité — 5 rue Payenne, Distrikt Le Marais, Paris
 Templo da Humanidade — Rua Benjamin Constant 74, Rio de Janeiro, Brasil
  Capela Positivista — Avenida João Pessoa 1058, Porto Alegre, Brasil 
  Capela Positivista — Rua Riachuelo 90, Curitiba, Brasil
 Newton Hall – Fleur-de-lis Court, off Fetter Lane, Fleet Street, London
Church of Humanity –  Upper Parliament Street, Liverpool
Church of Humanity – Newcastle upon Tyne

See also 
 Religion of Humanity - In France and Brazil, possibly more directly from Comte.

References

Further reading 
 Aldanov, Mark. 1944. "A Russian Commune in Kansas." Russian Review 4 (1):30–44.
Bevir, Mark. 2002. "Sidney Webb: Utilitarianism, Positivism, and Social Democracy." The Journal of Modern History 74 (2):217–252.
Billington, James H. 1960. "The Intelligentsia and the Religion of Humanity." The American Historical Review 65 (4):807–821.
Bourdeau, Michel, Mary Pickering, and Warren Schmaus, eds. 2018. Love, Order and Progress. Pittsburgh: University of Pittsburgh Press.
Bryson, Gladys. 1936. "Early English Positivists and the Religion of Humanity." American Sociological Review 1 (3):343–62.
Claeys, Gregory. 2010. Imperial Sceptics. Cambridge: Cambridge University Press.
Claeys, Gregory. 2018. "Professor Beesly, Positivism and the International: the Patriotism Issue." In "Arise Ye Wretched of the Earth": The First International in a Global Perspective, edited by Fabrice Bensimon, Quinton Deluermoz and Jeanne Moisand. Leiden: Brill.
Feichtinger, Johannes, Franz L. Fillafer, and Jan Surman, eds. 2018. The Worlds of Positivism. London: Palgrave Macmillan.
Forbes, Geraldine. 2018. "Striking a Chord: The Reception of Comte’s Positivism in Colonial India." In The Worlds of Positivism, edited by Johannes Feichtinger, Franz L. Fillafer and Jan Surman, 31–52. London: Palgrave Macmillan.
Gilson, Gregory D., and Irving W. Levinson, eds. 2013. Latin American Positivism. Lanham: Lexington.
Harp, Gillis J. 1991. "The Church of Humanity." Church History 60 (4):508–523.
Harp, Gillis J. 1995. Positivist Republic. University Park: Pennsylvania State University Press.
Harrison, Frederic. 1911. Autobiographic Memoirs. 2 vols. Vol. II. London: Macmillan.
Harrison, Frederic. 1911. Autobiographic Memoirs. 2 vols. Vol. I. London: Macmillan.
Harrison, Frederic. 1912. Among My Books. Centenaries, Reviews, Memoirs. London: Macmillan & Co.
Lenzer, Gertrud, ed. 2009. The Essential Writings of Auguste Comte and Positivism. London: Transaction.
McGee, John Edwin. 1931. A Crusade for Humanity: the History of Organized Positivism in England. London: Watts.
Pickering, Mary. 1993. Auguste Comte. 3 vols. Vol. I. Cambridge: Cambridge University Press.
Pickering, Mary. 2017. "Auguste Comte and the Curious Case of English Women." In The Anthem Companion to Auguste Comte, edited by Andrew Wernick, 175–204.
Quin, Malcolm. 1924. Memoirs of a Positivist. London: Allen, Unwin.
Raeder, Linda C. 2002. John Stuart Mill and the Religion of Humanity. Columbia: University of Missouri Press.
Simon, W.M. 1963. European Positivism in the Nineteenth Century. Ithaca: Cornell University Press.
Sutton, Michael. 1982. Nationalism, Positivism and Catholicism. Cambridge: Cambridge University Press.
Vogeler, Martha S. 1978. "Frederic Harrison and the Religion of Humanity." The Ethical Record 83 (10):3–6.
Wernick, Andrew. 2001. Auguste Comte and the Religion of Humanity. Cambridge: Cambridge University Press.
Whatmore, Richard. 2005. "Comte, Auguste (1798-1857)." In Encyclopaedia of Nineteenth-Century Thought, edited by Gregory Claeys, 123–8. London: Routledge.
Wilson, Matthew. 2016. "The Utopian Moment." In Utopia(s) Worlds And Frontiers Of The Imaginary, edited by Maria do Rosário  Monteiro and Mário S. Ming  Kong, 77–82. CRC.
Wilson, Matthew. 2018. Moralising Space. London: Routledge.
Wilson, Matthew. 2019. "Dwelling in Possibility?  A Case Study of Deep Heritage Conservation: Liverpool’s Temple of Humanity." In Routledge Companion of Global Heritage Conservation, edited by Vinayak Bharne. Routledge.
Wilson, Matthew. 2019. "Labour, Utopia and Modern Design Theory." Intellectual History Review 29 (2):313–35.
Wilson, Matthew. 2020. "Rendering sociology." Journal of Interdisciplinary History of Ideas 8 (16):1–42.
Wunderlich, Roger. 1992. Low Living and High Thinking at Modern Times, New York. Syracuse: Syracuse University Press.

1878 establishments in England
Comtism
History of New York City
Nontheism
Social history of London